Berney Arms railway station is on the Wherry Lines in the East of England, serving the settlement of Berney Arms on the Halvergate Marshes in Norfolk. It is managed by Greater Anglia, which also operates all trains serving the station. The limited number of services timetabled to stop do so on request only.

It is several miles from the nearest road and thus is accessible only by train, on foot, or by boat, as it is a relatively short walk from the River Yare, where private boats can moor. It was adopted in 2010 as part of the Station Adoption Scheme.

History

The Bill for the Yarmouth & Norwich Railway (Y&NR) received Royal Assent on 18 June 1842. Work started on the line in April 1843 and it and its stations were opened on 1 May 1844. The Y&NR was the first public railway line in Norfolk. A local landowner, Thomas Trench Berney, sold the land on the marshes to the railway company on the condition that Berney Arms station be built. A few years later, the railway stopped serving it, saying that there had been no agreement for trains to actually call at the station that they agreed to build. However, after lengthy legal proceedings, it was agreed to serve the station in perpetuity.

The Y&NR was the first public railway line in Norfolk. On 30 June 1845 a Bill authorising the amalgamation of the Y&NR with the Norwich & Brandon Railway came into effect and Berney Arms station became a Norfolk Railway asset.

The Eastern Counties Railway (ECR) and its rival the Eastern Union Railway (EUR) were both sizing up the NR to acquire and expand their networks. The ECR trumped the EUR by taking over the NR, including Berney Arms, effective 8 May 1848.

By the 1860s the railways in East Anglia were in financial trouble, and most were leased to the ECR, which wished to amalgamate formally but could not obtain government agreement for this until an Act of Parliament on 7 August 1862, when the Great Eastern Railway (GER) was formed by the consolidation. Actually, Berney Arms had become a GER station on 1 July 1862 when the GER took over the ECR and the EUR before the Bill received its Royal Assent.

The system settled down for the next six decades, apart from the disruption of World War I. The difficult economic circumstances that existed after the war led the government to pass the Railways Act 1921 which led to the creation of the so-called "Big Four" companies. The GER amalgamated with several other companies to form the London and North Eastern Railway (LNER). Berney Arms became an LNER station on 1 January 1923.

Upon nationalisation in 1948 the station and its services became part of the Eastern Region of British Railways.

The post office at Berney Arms Station, which had opened in 1898, was closed in 1967.

On privatisation the station and its services were transferred to Anglia Railways, which operated it until 2004, when National Express East Anglia won the replacement franchise, operating under the brand name 'one' until 2008. In 2012 Abellio Greater Anglia took over operating the franchise.

The former Berney Arms signal box is preserved at Mangapps Railway Museum in Burnham-on-Crouch, Essex.

Least-used station 

On 1 December 2020, Berney Arms was announced as the least used station in Great Britain for the 2019/20 period (between April 2019 and March 2020), with only 42 people using the station. The low numbers were largely due to the station being closed for major signalling works along the line for much of the 2019/20 period, but were also caused by the local pub being closed down. This is also one of the main reasons that passenger numbers had been falling dramatically since the 2016/17 period.

However, the station was used by 348 passengers in the year to March 2021; the greatest yearly rise for any station in the UK.

Locality
The surrounding marshland is managed as the RSPB Berney Marshes reserve and is adjacent to Breydon Water, a major site for wildfowl. Berney Arms Windmill, owned by English Heritage, is located on the Yare near to the station, as is the Berney Arms public house (currently closed).
The Weavers' Way and Wherryman's Way long-distance footpaths both pass near the station.

Services

The line is on part of the Wherry Lines currently operated by Greater Anglia. Services are formed by Class 755s.
The station is a stop for two trains per day to Norwich and two to Great Yarmouth; the service is increased on Sundays to four trains in each direction. Service frequencies generally increase slightly during the summer period, to three trains in each direction per day and five in each direction at the weekend.
During the winter months up until the end of March, the last train from Great Yarmouth to Norwich does not stop at Berney Arms. This is because of the lack of light at the station and its surrounding area. After the clocks go forward, the last trains are timetabled to stop again (17:54 Mondays to Saturdays, 16:24 Sundays).

In October 2018 the line between Great Yarmouth and Reedham was closed for a major upgrade of the signalling system, as part of works on all the Wherry Lines. While the line was closed the station remained open, although no replacement service was available due to the remote location. Its reopening was delayed until February 2020, with the station reopening on 24 February 2020.

References

Note

Further reading

External links

Walking guides, travel information and things to do at Berney Arms.
History and photographs on Berney Arms Web
Large scale map and walk
Video about Berney Arms railway station and the local area

Railway stations in Norfolk
DfT Category F2 stations
Former Great Eastern Railway stations
Railway stations in Great Britain opened in 1844
Greater Anglia franchise railway stations
Railway stations in Great Britain without road access
Low usage railway stations in the United Kingdom